TTK may refer to:
 Kosrae International Airport, FAA LID
 the Third Ring Road (Moscow), abbreviated ТТК in Russian
 Tiruvellore Thattai Krishnamachariar (1899–1974), an Indian politician
 Totsuka Station, JR East station code
 Turkish Historical Association
 Turkish Hard Coal Enterprises
 TTK (gene)
 TTK Group, India

ttk may refer to:
 Totoro language, ISO 639-3 code